Razmareh (also Romanized as Rāzmareh) is a village in Ferdows Rural District, in the Central District of Shahriar County, Tehran Province, Iran. At the 2006 census, its population was 34, in 7 families.

References 

Populated places in Shahriar County